The Dutch Allround Championships of speed skating, organised by the KNSB, is the official Dutch championship to determine the Dutch Allround champion, in contrast to the KNSB Dutch Single Distance Championships, which determines a Dutch champion for each distance. The Allround distance championships date back to 1901 for men and 1955 for women.

Men's Allround

Source:

Women's Allround

source:

References
Notes

Bibliography

 Broer, Dirk with Martin van der Bij, Jeroen Heijmans, Michiel Jansen, Marnix Koolhaas, Robert Koorneef, Huub Snoep, Gerrit Stevens and Nol Terwindt. Nederlandse Kampioenschappen Hardrijden Langebaan: Complete UItslagen, 1887-2003. Hoogland: KNSB, 2003.

Dutch Speed Skating Championships
Speed skating in the Netherlands